Antonius "Ton" van den Hurk (3 March 1933 – 6 April 2021) was a Dutch footballer who played as a defender.

Playing career

Club
Born in Eindhoven, van den Hurk started his career at local club FC Eindhoven, but moved to newly founded professional side Sportclub Venlo '54 in 1954 after experiencing lack of playing time. After Venlo'54 merged with amateur club VVV-Venlo, he scored FC VVV's first ever professional league goal from the penalty spot on 28 November 1954 away against Ajax. He later won the 1958–59 KNVB Cup with the club.

After relegation from the Eredivisie in 1962, he was sold to Sittardia, but left them in 1963 for amateur club SV Panningen, only to return to VVV for one more season. He played his last game for them in April 1965 against FC Volendam.

International
He earned 13 caps for the Netherlands national under-19 team between 1950 and 1951.

Managerial career
Van den Hurk coached at amateur sides Belfeldia, SV Blerick, Wittenhorst and VV Swalmen.

References

External links
Profile - Voetballegends 

1933 births
2021 deaths
Footballers from Eindhoven
Association football defenders
Dutch footballers
Netherlands youth international footballers
FC Eindhoven players
VVV-Venlo players
Fortuna Sittard players
Eredivisie players
Eerste Divisie players